My Side may refer to:
 "My Side", a song on Care Package by Canadian artist Drake
 My Side, the autobiography of footballer David Beckham